The Panvel–Dahanu Road MEMU is a Mainline Electrical Multiple Units train belonging to Western Railway zone that runs between  and  in India. It is currently being operated with 69161/69164 train numbers on a daily basis.

Service 

69161/Panvel–Dahanu Road MEMU has an average speed of 41 km/hr and covers 136 km in 3h 20m. The 
69164/Dahanu Road–Panvel MEMU has an average speed of 40 km/hr and covers 136 km in 3h 25m.

Route and halts

The important halts of the train are:

See also 

 Dahanu Road railway station
 Panvel Junction railway station
 Vasai Road–Diva DEMU
 Panvel–Vasai Road MEMU

Notes

References

External links 

 69161/Panvel–Dahanu Road MEMU
 69164/Dahanu Road–Panvel MEMU

Rail transport in Maharashtra
Electric multiple units of India
Transport in Palghar district
Transport in Panvel